Gáspár Miklós Tamás (G. M. Tamás; ; 28 November 1948 – 15 January 2023), often referred to as TGM, was a Romanian-born Hungarian marxist-anarcho-syndicalist philosopher and public intellectual. He was a contributor to online newspaper Mérce and to OpenDemocracy, where he wrote primarily about political and aesthetic questions. He was the father of British poet and writer Rebecca Tamás.

Biography
Gáspár Miklós Tamás was born in today's Cluj, Romania, but emigrated to Budapest, Hungary, in 1978, where he lived for much of his life. His mother was Jewish and escaped being deported to Auschwitz because she was imprisoned for being a communist. As a dissident at the end of the state socialist (communist) period, he was initially a libertarian socialist. While in contact with libertarian authors, his perspective was distinct from the Budapest School, a major school of thought in Hungarian Neo-Marxism. He was also a member of the informal group called democratic opposition. From 1986 to 1988, he taught in the U.S., Britain, and France, and also continued his studies at Oxford University. At the beginning of the post-socialist era in 1989, he became committed to a liberal program, and was a leader of the Alliance of Free Democrats. He served in the Hungarian Parliament as a representative of the Alliance of Free Democrats (SZDSZ), from 1989 to 1994. He re-identified as a Marxist in the early years of the 21st century. He served as President of the extra-parliamentary Green Left between 2010 and 2011.

Tamás was a vocal opponent of the Hungarian government led by Viktor Orbán and the Fidesz party, as well as capitalism and neoliberalism. His theoretical work draws on the ideas of Italian autonomism (Antonio Negri), German Neue Marx-Lektüre (Hans-Georg Backhaus and Helmut Reichelt), and American Political Marxism (Robert Brenner and Ellen Meiksins Wood). He also refers to the insights of - among others - Georges Bataille and Moishe Postone.

Tamás was known for developing the concept of post-fascism. and also invented the term ethnicism. In his words, 

Tamás died on 15 January 2023, at the age of 74.

Bibliography

Books in English

Books in French

Books in German

Books in Hungarian

Tamás, Gáspár Miklós (2021) Antitézis [Antithesis] (in Hungarian). Budapest, Hungary: Pesti Kalligram. ISBN 9789634682035

External links
 Some of his lectures: 1, 2, 3, 4,5, 6, 7
 Some of his speeches: 1, 2
 Central European University: Academic Profile of Gáspár Miklós Tamás
 "Hatred and Betrayal." The Guardian, 9 May 2007.
 "Hungary: Where We Went Wrong." Interview with Chris Harman. International Socialism, 24 June 2009. 
 "The Left and Marxism in Eastern Europe: An Interview with Gáspár Miklós Tamás." Interview with Imre Szeman. Mediations: Journal of the Marxist Literary Group, volume 24, number 2, Spring 2009. 
 "On Post-Fascism." Boston Review, Summer 2000. 
"Socialism and Freedom." Jacobin, 5.12.2015. 
 "Telling the Truth about Class." Socialist Register vol. 42, 2006. 
 "Words from Budapest." New Left Review 80, March–April 2013.

References

1948 births
2023 deaths
21st-century Hungarian philosophers
20th-century Romanian philosophers
21st-century Romanian philosophers
Critical theorists
Writers from Cluj-Napoca
Babeș-Bolyai University alumni
Marxist theorists
Romanian Marxists
Hungarian Marxist writers
Romanian people of Jewish descent
Romanian anti-communists
Hungarian philosophers
Academic staff of Central European University
Members of the National Assembly of Hungary (1985–1990)
Members of the National Assembly of Hungary (1990–1994)
Alliance of Free Democrats politicians
Commander's Crosses with Star of the Order of Merit of the Republic of Hungary (military)
Hungarian people of Jewish descent
Romanian anarchists
Hungarian anarchists